Magruder Mountain is a summit in the U.S. state of Nevada.

Magruder Mountain was named after John B. Magruder, an American Confederate Army general.

References

Mountains of Esmeralda County, Nevada